St. James is a city in and the county seat of Watonwan County, Minnesota, United States. The population was 4,793 at the 2020 census.

Minnesota State Highways 4, 30, and 60 are three of the main routes in the city.

History
In 1870, the directors of the St. Paul and Sioux City railroads chose the future townsite of St. James as the midpoint for a new railroad linking the two cities. Named for James Purington, an early settler, the new city was incorporated in 1871. It was the hometown of Minnesota Governor Winfield Scott Hammond, a Democrat who served in 1915. In the 1940s, Theodore S. Mondale, the father of future Vice President of the United States Walter Mondale, was the pastor at First Methodist Church of St. James. Tony Downs Foods Co. has been a major employer since 1947, processing poultry and frozen meals.

St. James has two properties listed on the National Register of Historic Places: the Grand Opera House, completed in 1892, and the Watonwan County Courthouse, completed in 1896.

Geography

Climate

Demographics

2010 census
As of the census of 2010, there were 4,605 people, 1,839 households, and 1,145 families living in the city. The racial makeup of the city was 81.8% White, 0.7% African American, 0.9% Native American, 0.6% Asian, 14.9% from other races, and 1.1% from two or more races. Hispanic or Latino of any race were 31.0% of the population.

There were 1,839 households, of which 32.2% had children under the age of 18 living with them, 45.8% were married couples living together, 11.0% had a female householder with no husband present, 5.4% had a male householder with no wife present, and 37.7% were non-families. 33.4% of all households were made up of individuals, and 17.1% had someone living alone who was 65 years of age or older. The average household size was 2.47 and the average family size was 3.17.

The median age in the city was 37.8 years. 27.8% of residents were under the age of 18; 7.3% were between the ages of 18 and 24; 23.6% were from 25 to 44; 23.3% were from 45 to 64; and 17.9% were 65 years of age or older. The gender makeup of the city was 48.7% male and 51.3% female.

2000 census
As of the census of 2000, there were 4,695 people, 1,845 households, and 1,186 families living in the city. The racial makeup of the city was 83.24% White, 0.40% African American, 0.15% Native American, 0.51% Asian, 14.27% from other races, and 1.43% from two or more races. Hispanic or Latino of any race were 23.77% of the population.

There were 1,845 households, out of which 32.1% had children under the age of 18 living with them, 51.1% were married couples living together, 9.6% had a female householder with no husband present, and 35.7% were non-families. 32.0% of all households were made up of individuals, and 17.7% had someone living alone who was 65 years of age or older.  The average household size was 2.50 and the average family size was 3.16.

In the city, the population was spread out, with 27.9% under the age of 18, 9.5% from 18 to 24, 23.9% from 25 to 44, 20.0% from 45 to 64, and 18.7% who were 65 years of age or older.  The median age was 35 years. For every 100 females, there were 88.9 males.  For every 100 females age 18 and over, there were 86.4 males.

The median income for a household in the city was $33,196, and the median income for a family was $40,993. Males had a median income of $30,036 versus $19,391 for females. The per capita income for the city was $15,336.  About 9.0% of families and 10.8% of the population were below the poverty line, including 16.5% of those under age 18 and 9.9% of those age 65 or over.

Politics

Transport
The city owns and operates the St. James Municipal Airport.

Notable people
 Moses K. Armstrong, businessman and legislator
 Becky Buller, bluegrass musician
 Peter Eckerstrom, Arizona Court of Appeals judge
 Carl L. Johnson, businessman and legislator
 Henry Norman Graven, United States District Court judge, born in St. James
 Winfield Scott Hammond, 18th Minnesota governor, established his home and his law practice in St. James
 Mac Hegstrom, businessman and politician, born in St. James
 Mike Kingery, professional baseball player, born in St. James
 Gary Mielke, professional baseball player, born in St. James
 Carl G. Olson, farmer and politician, born in St. James

Media

Television

References

External links

City Website
St. James Public Schools
St. James Chamber of Commerce
St. James Plaindealer newspaper site

Cities in Watonwan County, Minnesota
Cities in Minnesota
County seats in Minnesota